Van Halen is a Dutch surname, and also the name of the American hard rock band Van Halen. Well-known individuals who have the surname include:

 Alex Van Halen, Dutch-born American rock drummer of the aforementioned rock band.
 Eddie Van Halen (1955–2020), Alex's brother, guitarist of the same band.
 Wolfgang Van Halen, Eddie's son, and the bassist of the band from 2006 until 2020.

Dutch-language surnames